Ashbury may refer to:

Places 
Ashbury, Bangor, a suburb of Bangor, Northern Ireland
Ashbury, Bloemfontein, South Africa
Ashbury Camp, Cornwall, England, an Iron Age hillfort
Ashbury, Devon, England
Ashbury railway station, a closed railway station
Ashbury, New South Wales, a suburb of Sydney, Australia
Ashbury, Oxfordshire, England
Ashbury, Western Cape, South Africa
Haight-Ashbury, a district of San Francisco, California, United States, notable for being the center of 60s drug culture

People 
James Lloyd Ashbury (1834–1895), British yachtsman and politician
Joseph Ashbury (1638–1720), English actor and theatrical manager

Other 
Ashbury (band), an Alternative rock band from Las Vegas, NV
Ashbury College, a school in Ottawa, Canada
Ashbury Heights, a Swedish synthpop music band
Ashbury Railway Carriage and Iron Company Ltd, a manufacturer of railway equipment
Trail mix

See also
 Ashburys railway station, Manchester, England, named after the railway carriage company